They Bite is a 1996 American science-fiction horror film directed by Brett Piper and starring Ron Jeremy, Nick Baldasare, Donna Frotscher, and Christina Veronica.

The film follows some of the premise covered in the Roger Corman film Humanoids from the Deep – sea creatures coming to shore and attacking and mating with humans, but also contains the idea of a film-within-a-film device. A film crew (Nick Baldasare plays the director Mel Duncan) are on location making a film Invasion of the Fishfuckers – which happens to be a story about sea creatures coming ashore and attacking and mating with humans. Ron Jeremy is part of this film crew. Whilst they are making the film, coincidentally the very thing they're filming seems to be happening around them. Thus, there is a blurring between reality and fiction.

The film is noted for being featured in the third episode of Red Letter Media's series Best of the Worst.

Production
Filming took place in New Hampshire.

Release
They Bite was released on VHS and has not been released on DVD or Blu-ray.

References

External links
 

1996 films
American science fiction horror films
1990s science fiction horror films
1990s English-language films
1990s American films